is a triple A-side maxi single released by the Japanese heavy metal band Maximum the Hormone. The single was released on March 23, 2011. The title of the single is a pun by the band, telling the fans that: "Greatest Hits doesn't necessarily mean a collection of past titles. We can say these new songs are our best!". The single comes with three separate covers, one for each song, and also comes packaged with a "bonus booklet" which is a collected and edited version of Maximum the Ryo-Kun's column in Bubuka magazine titled "Maximum The Ryo-kun's Legal Trip".

The single peaked at number 1 for two consecutive weeks on the Oricon charts selling more than 81,000 in its first week, and making this the first time Maximum the Hormone has ever topped a chart since their creation in 1998. It is also their best opening week, beating previous single "Tsume Tsume Tsume/'F'" who had sold approximately 62,000 copies in its first week. It was also certified by the RIAJ as gold for a shipping of more than 100,000 physical copies.

All three tracks are available on the album Yoshū Fukushū.

Track listing

Personnel
 Daisuke - vocals
 Maximum the Ryo - guitar, clean vocals
 Nao - drums, vocals
 Ue-chan - bass guitar, backing vocals

References

2011 singles
Maximum the Hormone songs
Oricon Weekly number-one singles
Billboard Japan Hot 100 number-one singles